Oodinkosa is a genus of beetles in the family Carabidae, containing the following species:

 Oodinkosa crassula Straneo, 1939
 Oodinkosa massarti (Burgeon, 1935)
 Oodinkosa punctulata Straneo, 1951

References

Pterostichinae